Crowned: The Mother of All Pageants is an eight-episode competition that featured multiple mother-daughter teams working together as pairs to win a beauty pageant competition. The show ran for eight episodes on The CW from December 12, 2007, to January 30, 2008.

The competition was judged by Carson Kressley, Shanna Moakler and television personality Cynthia Garrett.

Each pair attempted to brand a 'style' for their mother/daughter team via clothing and swimwear, create ways of expressing a point of view about issues in the world, and practice for the big pageant dance number. The prize package included a $100,000 cash award, a custom-designed platinum and diamond crown necklace, and tiaras.

The show was a production of Swim Entertainment and Fox Television Studios, with creator/executive producer Laurie Girion (Cheerleader Nation, Last Comic Standing 2).

On May 13, 2008, The CW officially cancelled the series.

Contestants

Nielsen ratings

References

External links
Official site (via Internet Archive)

The CW original programming
2007 American television series debuts
2008 American television series endings
2000s American reality television series
Television series by 20th Century Fox Television
Beauty pageants in the United States